Buckland-by-Faversham was one of the parishes to the south-west of Faversham in Kent, England. It is now part of Faversham town. The parish church no longer exists, and is covered by the church at Norton.

References

External links
 Norton church

Faversham